The Centro de Investigaciones Sociológicas ("Centre for Sociological Research") or CIS is a Spanish public research institute. It was founded in 1963 as the Instituto de la Opinión Pública, and in 1977, after the Spanish general election in that year, acquired its present name.

The institute publishes the Revista Española de Investigaciones Sociológicas and various series of books.

Since 2018, the President of the CIS is José Félix Tezanos.

References

Research institutes in Spain